Artur Arturovich Dmitriev (born 7 September 1992) is a Russian figure skater, who currently competes for the United States. He is the 2015 CS Ice Challenge champion, 2014 Cup of Nice silver medalist, and competed at three World Junior Championships, twice finishing in the top ten. He was the first skater ever to attempt a quadruple axel in international competition.

As of October 2021, he competes for the U.S.

Personal life 
Artur Dmitriev Jr. was born in Saint Petersburg, Russia, the son of Tatiana Druchinina, a World champion in rhythmic gymnastics, and Artur Dmitriev, a two-time Olympic champion in pair skating. At around age seven, he moved with his family to the United States and lived there for seven years. His parents divorced in 2006. Dmitriev Jr. has a half-brother, Artiom, from his father's second marriage. He speaks Russian and English.

Dmitriev Jr. married former figure skater Ekaterina Dmitrieva (Ukolova) in August 2020.

Career 
Dmitriev began skating seriously at about the age of seven or eight in Hackensack, New Jersey. At age 11, he received 280 stitches after his face was cut by another skater's blade in Hackensack. Around 2007, he began working with Alexei Mishin at the Yubileyny Sports Palace in Saint Petersburg.

At the 2010 World Junior Championships, Dmitriev was the only skater to land a quad toe loop in the long program, which he did in combination with a double toe. He rose from 15th after the short program to finish 7th overall. He continued to work on his quads and practiced a quad salchow and loop in May 2010 but was hampered by back problems during the 2010-11 season.

In late 2010, Dmitriev moved to Moscow to train with Elena Vodorezova (Buianova). In the 2012–13 season, he switched to Nikolai Morozov but missed most of the season after breaking two bones, in his knee and foot.

In March 2014, Dmitriev moved back to Saint Petersburg and rejoined Mishin. In the 2014–15 season, he won the silver medal at the International Cup of Nice and bronze at his first ISU Challenger Series (CS) event, the Volvo Open Cup.  At the 2015 Russian Championships he withdrew after the short program.

In the 2015–16 season, he won a CS competition, the Ice Challenge, with a total score 6.92 points greater than the silver medalist, Jason Brown. A week later he won the 2015 Volvo Open Cup. On December 24–27, he finished 10th at the 2016 Russian Championships.

In November 2016 Dmitriev made his Grand Prix debut at the 2016 Rostelecom Cup where he placed 10th. A week later he skated his 2nd GP event at the 2016 Trophée de France where he placed 9th. In December 2016 he placed 8th at the 2017 Russian Championships. In February 2017 he competed at the 2017 Winter Universiade where he finished 4th.

In the 2017–18 season, he won the bronze medal at the 2017 CS Golden Spin of Zagreb and finished 5th at the 2018 Russian Championships.

In the 2018–19 season, he started his season at the 2018 CS Nebelhorn Trophy where he won the bronze medal. At the 2018 Rostelecom Cup, he placed eleventh overall after falling on his quadruple axel attempt in the free program.

In 2021, Dmitriev announced his intention to compete for the United States. He competed in the US Championship Series, the qualifying series for the 2022 U.S. Figure Skating Championships. He competed at the event in Leesburg, Virginia. He was fourth after the short, second in the free and third overall among four skaters. He is also scheduled to compete at the event in Alpharetta, Georgia.

Skating technique 
Dmitriev was the first man to land a 3Lz+3F cleanly in competition at the 2018 CS Nebelhorn Trophy. At the 2018 Rostelecom Cup, Dmitriev attempted a quadruple axel; this made him the first skater ever to attempt a quadruple axel in international competition.

Programs

Competitive highlights 

GP: Grand Prix; CS: Challenger Series; JGP: Junior Grand Prix

For the U.S.

For Russia

Detailed results 
Small medals for short and free programs awarded only at ISU Championships.

References

External links 

 

Russian male single skaters
1992 births
Living people
Figure skaters from Saint Petersburg
Competitors at the 2017 Winter Universiade